Alex Wellerstein (born 5 September 1981) is a historian of science at the Stevens Institute of Technology who studies the history of nuclear weapons. He is the creator of NUKEMAP.

Background
Wellerstein grew up in Stockton, California. He received a Bachelors of Arts in history from University of California, Berkeley in 2002, and a doctorate in the history of science from Harvard University in 2010. He was once a graduate fellow for the United States Department of Energy, a lecturer at Harvard University, a postdoctoral researcher at the Harvard Kennedy School, and an associate historian at the American Institute of Physics. Since 2014, he has been a professor of Science and Technology Studies at the Stevens Institute of Technology.

In 2021, his book Restricted Data: The History of Nuclear Secrecy in the United States was published by the University of Chicago Press.

Selected publications
 "Patenting the bomb: Nuclear weapons, intellectual property, and technological control," Isis 99, no. 1 (March 2008): 57–87. 
 "Inside the Atomic Patent Office," Bulletin of the Atomic Scientists 64, no. 2 (May/June 2008): 26–31, 60–61. 
 "From Classified to Commonplace: The Trajectory of the Hydrogen Bomb 'Secret'," Endeavour 32, no. 2 (June 2008): 47–52. 
 "Die geheimen Patente – eine andere Sicht auf die Atombombe," in Atombilder: Ikongraphien des Atoms in Wissenschaft und Öffentlichkeit des 20. Jahrhundertsts, ed. Jochen Hennig and Charlotte Bigg (Berlin: Wallstein Verlag, 2009): 159–167. 
 "States of Eugenics: Institutions and the Practices of Compulsory Sterilization in California," in Sheila Jasanoff, ed., Reframing Rights: Bioconstitutionalism in the Genetic Age (Cambridge, Mass.: MIT Press, 2011): 29–58. 
 "A Tale of Openness and Secrecy: The Philadelphia Story," Physics Today 65, no. 5 (May 2012), 47–53. 

 "Manhattan Project," Encyclopedia for the History of Science (April 2019).  

 (with Edward Geist), "The secret of the Soviet hydrogen bomb," Physics Today 70, no. 4 (March 2017), 40–47. 

 "John Wheeler's H-bomb Blues," Physics Today 72, no. 4 (2019): 42–51. 

 "The Kyoto Misconception: What Truman Knew, and Didn't Know, About Hiroshima," in Michael D. Gordin and G. John Ikenberry, eds., The Age of Hiroshima (Princeton, N.J.: Princeton University Press, 2020): 34–55. 

 "Counting the Dead at Hiroshima and Nagasaki," Bulletin of the Atomic Scientists (4 August 2020).

 Restricted Data: The History of Nuclear Secrecy in the United States (Chicago: University of Chicago Press, 2021). 

 "The Untold Story of the World's Biggest Nuclear Bomb," Bulletin of the Atomic Scientists (29 October 2021).

References

External links

Living people
American historians of science
Historians of nuclear weapons
Harvard Graduate School of Arts and Sciences alumni
UC Berkeley College of Letters and Science alumni
Writers from Stockton, California
Stevens Institute of Technology faculty
1981 births
Historians from California